Ram Harakh Yadav was an Indian politician.  He was elected to the Lok Sabha, the lower house of the Parliament of India  as a member of the Indian National Congress.

References

External links
Official biographical sketch in Lok Sabha website

1895 births
Lok Sabha members from Uttar Pradesh
India MPs 1962–1967
Indian National Congress politicians
Year of death missing